Resolution is a settlement on the island of Saint Thomas in the United States Virgin Islands. It is part of the Northside Administrative District. Crown Mountain, the highest point in the US Virgin Islands, is in Resolution.

References

Populated places in Saint Thomas, U.S. Virgin Islands
Northside, Saint Thomas, U.S. Virgin Islands